Lefkouda is a village of the Volvi municipality in Greece. Before the 2011 local government reform it was part of the municipality of Arethousa. The 2011 census recorded 121 inhabitants in the village. Lefkouda is a part of the community of Arethousa.

See also
 List of settlements in the Thessaloniki regional unit

References

Populated places in Thessaloniki (regional unit)